The Lost Paradise (German: Das verlorene Paradies) is a 1917 German silent film directed by Bruno Rahn and starring Mady Christians, Erich Kaiser-Titz and Bruno Kastner.

Partial cast
 Mady Christians as Edith Bernardi  
 Erich Kaiser-Titz 
 Bruno Kastner as Hans Arndt
 Bruno Eichgrün

References

Bibliography
 Parish, James Robert. Film Actors Guide. Scarecrow Press, 1977.

External links

1917 films
Films of the German Empire
German silent feature films
Films directed by Bruno Rahn
Films based on German novels
German black-and-white films
1910s German films